Echolocations: River is the eleventh solo studio album by American songwriter and musician Andrew Bird. It is the second album in his Echolocations series, the first one being "Echolocations: Canyon." The album makes prominent use of field recording, with Bird performing in the Los Angeles River under the Hyperion Bridge. Additional studio recordings were added to supplement the field recordings and flesh out the compositions.

Track listing

"Gypsy Moth" is a different rendition of Bird's 2016 composition "Roma Fade."

Reception 
Steve Horowitz of PopMatters rated the album 8/10, writing: "The ambient sounds of the waterway combine with Bird’s playing and use of sonic effects to create a heightened sense of tranquility."

Personnel

Andrew Bird – violin, songwriting
David Boucher – field recordings, mixing
Adam Samuel Goldman – production, studio recording, additional instruments

References

2017 albums
Andrew Bird albums